Peristichia lepta is a species of sea snail, a marine gastropod mollusk in the family Pyramidellidae, the pyrams and their allies.

Description
The shell grows to a length of 4.2 mm.

Distribution
This species occurs in the Atlantic Ocean off Southeast Brazil.

References

 Pimenta A.D., Santos F.N. & Absalão R.S. 2008. Review of the genera Ividia, Folinella, Menestho, Pseudoscilla, Tryptichus and Peristichia (Gastropoda, Pyramidellidae) from Brazil, with descriptions of four new species. The Veliger 50(3): 171-184.

External links
 To Encyclopedia of Life
 To World Register of Marine Species
 
 Güller M. & Zelaya D.G. (2019). Revision of Pyramidellidae (Gastropoda: Heterobranchia) from Argentina triples their diversity in northern Patagonia. Journal of Molluscan Studies. 85(1): 103-125

Pyramidellidae
Gastropods described in 2008